Lebanon Senior High School is the only secondary school in the Lebanon Community School Corporation.

History
Lebanon has had a high school since 1876.  The current building was constructed in 1958, with upgrades in 1967, 1972 and 1990. Two of the more famous faculty/staff alumni are Ward Lambert and Glenn M. Curtis.

Demographics
The demographic breakdown of the 1,009 students enrolled for the 2017-2018 school year was:
Male - 50.0%
Female - 50.0%
Native American/Alaskan - 25.0%
Asian - 1.2%
Black - 2.4%
Hispanic - 5.9%
White - None
Multiracial - 2.5%

In addition, 59.9% of the students were eligible for free or reduced-cost lunch. For 2017-18, Lebanon was a Title I school.

Athletics
The Lebanon Tigers compete in the Sagamore Athletic Conference.  The school colors are black and Vegas gold.  The following IHSAA-sanctioned sports are offered:

Baseball (boys)
Basketball (girls & boys)
Boys state champions - 1912, 1917, 1918
Cross country (girls & boys)
Football (boys)
Golf (girls & boys)
Soccer (girls & boys)
Softball (girls)
 State champions - 2016
Swimming (girls & boys)
Tennis (girls & boys)
Track & field (girls & boys)
Volleyball (girls)
Wrestling (boys & girls)
 Girls State Champions - 2021

Notable alumni
 Doug Jones - Major League Baseball (MLB) relief pitcher 
 Rick Mount - National Basketball Association guard
 Drew Powell - actor 
 Craig Terrill - National Football League (NFL) defensive lineman

See also
 List of high schools in Indiana

References

External links 

 School district
 School website

Public high schools in Indiana
Schools in Boone County, Indiana
1876 establishments in Indiana